Mohamed Arafet Naceur (born November 4, 1988) is a Tunisian Olympic volleyball player.

References 

1988 births
Living people
Tunisian beach volleyball players
Olympic beach volleyball players of Tunisia
Beach volleyball players at the 2016 Summer Olympics
Competitors at the 2019 African Games
African Games competitors for Tunisia